TIHKAL: The Continuation is a 1997 book written by Alexander Shulgin and Ann Shulgin about a family of psychoactive drugs known as tryptamines. A sequel to PIHKAL: A Chemical Love Story, TIHKAL is an acronym that stands for "Tryptamines I Have Known and Loved".

Content
TIHKAL, much like its predecessor PIHKAL, is divided into two parts. The first part, for which all rights are reserved, begins with a fictionalized autobiography, picking up where the similar section of PIHKAL left off; it then continues with a collection of essays on topics ranging from psychotherapy and the Jungian mind to the prevalence of DMT in nature, ayahuasca and the War on Drugs. The second part of TIHKAL, which may be conditionally distributed for non-commercial reproduction (see external links below), is a detailed synthesis manual for 55 psychedelic compounds (many discovered by Alexander Shulgin himself), including their chemical structures, dosage recommendations, and qualitative comments. Shulgin has made the second part freely available on Erowid.org while the first part is available only in the printed text.

Like PIHKAL, the Shulgins were motivated to release the synthesis information as a way to protect the public's access to information about psychedelic compounds, a goal Alexander Shulgin has noted many times. Following a raid of his laboratory in 1994 by the United States DEA, Richard Meyer, spokesman for DEA's San Francisco Field Division, stated that "It is our opinion that those books [referring to the previous work, PIHKAL] are pretty much cookbooks on how to make illegal drugs. Agents tell me that in clandestine labs that they have raided, they have found copies of those books."

Tryptamines listed

See also 
 PiHKAL, the 1991 book by the same authors, on phenethylamines.

Notes

External links

 Erowid Online Books: TIHKAL: The Continuation by Alexander & Ann Shulgin
 "Shulgin in Spanish" Project – Information on the first complete translation of PIHKAL and TIHKAL into Spanish
 TIHKAL • Info: A visual index and map of TIHKAL, including the formatted text of Book II. Includes over 300 corrections to the original HTML version.
 Transform Press – Publisher of TiHKAL

Psychedelic drug research
Psychedelic literature
1997 non-fiction books
Science books